Narciso Masferrer Sala (26 April 1867 – 9 April 1941) was a pioneer of Catalan sports and sports journalism. He was present at most Catalan sports initiatives of the first third of the 20th century, founding and becoming director of a number of sporting projects, including some of the greatest sporting institutions in Catalonia, such as clubs, federations and sports press. Masferrer is widely regarded as one of the most important figures in the amateur beginnings of gymnastics and football in Spain, as he was the fundamental head behind the foundation of Spanish Gymnastic Federation in 1898, which acted as the Spanish football federation until 1909. He was the first promoter of sports in Spain with a global and ambitious vision.

He is best known for his pivotal role in the founding of FC Barcelona, publishing Joan Gamper's infamous advert in Los Deportes magazine to find players interested in forming a football team, and then hosting the infamous meeting at the Gimnasio Solé on 29 November 1899 that saw the birth of the club, of which he was a vice-president from 1909 to 1910, and he even held the presidency of the Catalan Football Federation in 1913. He also left a big mark in cycling, holding the presidency of the Unión Velocipédica Espanyola, the predecessor of the Catalan Cycling Federation, in 1911, from which he promoted the creation of the Volta a Catalunya, the first cycling race per stage in Spain and one of the oldest in the world.

As a pioneer of sports journalism, he was the founder of El Mundo Deportivo, Los Deportes and "Stadium" magazine, he was a correspondent for the French publication L'Auto and editor of La Vanguardia for 17 years, from 1912 to 1929. He was thus a very important figure in the construction of modern sports journalism in Spain. In the press, his activity was basically centered on the creation of innovative journalistic projects and the promotion of sporting activity among citizens.

First projects
Masferrer was born in Madrid in 1867 to Catalan parents and studied in France and Germany. His work as a journalist began in 1886, with the newspaper El Imparcial, and a year later, the 20-year-old Masferrer founded the Spanish Gymnastics Society and promoted the magazine El Gimnasta. In 1896, he moved to Barcelona for professional reasons, and his arrival was decisive in shaping the projects of Catalan sport. He would be the driving force that would transform the hesitant first steps into reality: clubs, federations, competitions, and the sports press. In 1897 he founded the Catalan Gymnastics Association and the fortnightly magazine Los Deportes. This publication, which ceased to be published in 1910, would become, throughout its life, the official organ of several entities, such as the Royal Association of Hunters of Barcelona and the Catalan Federation of Football Clubs. Before the end of the founding century, he founded the Spanish Gymnastic Federation in 1898, which in its beginnings acted as the Spanish Football Federation. The headquarters of his numerous associations and of the Los Deportes newsroom were based in the Solé Gymnasium, which was part of FEG.

FC Barcelona
In 1899 Joan Gamper and his friend Walter Wild arrived at the Solé Gym and they were well received by Masferrer, and on 22 October 1899, they published Gamper's infamous advert in Los Deportes declaring his wish to form a football club. Masferrer and his closest collaborators from the Gymnastic Federation considered football as the sport that had the best chance of hatching among that generation of Barcelona gymnasts, reaching that conclusion after doing different tests and trials with other outdoor sports such as gouret (the current hockey) or riscat (current children's rescue game). That is why the first Barcelona clubs were born in gyms and under the protection and encouragement of characters linked to the Spanish Gymnastic Federation such as Masferrer. On 29 November 1899, Masferrer attended the founding meeting of FC Barcelona, which was hosted by him at the Solé Gym, and he recounted in detail the development of the historic meeting in an article published in this newspaper on 29 November 1924, on the occasion of the 25th anniversary of the creation of the club. Without the work of Masferrer laying the foundations and helping consolidate Gamper's work, FC Barcelona might never have existed, leading some to regard him as the true founder of the club, or that at least, he should also be treated as one. Officially, however, the journalist from Madrid, not even when he was vice president of the club in the 1909–10 season.

Masferrer Sporting prime
In 1902 he founded Vida Deportiva and became a correspondent for the French magazine L'Auto. Four years later, in 1906, he founded and directed El Mundo Deportivo, becoming its first director, and in its first editorial, published on 1 February, Masferrer pointed out the conduct that needed to be followed by the newspaper, which did not differ at all from his own: "We do not come to criticize anyone, we come to applaud and encourage everyone". 1911 was remarkably prolific for Masferrer: he founded the magazine "Stadium", of which he was director until 1922; promoted and presided over the Union of Sports Journalists, and presided over Unión Velocipédica Espanyola, the predecessor of the Catalan Cycling Federation, where together with Miguel Artemán and Jaime Grau, he promoted the creation of the Volta a Catalunya, the first cycling race per stage in Spain and one of the oldest in the world. He intervened in the creation of the Catalan Olympic Committee (Comitè Olímpic Català) in 1913, and in the reorganization of the Spanish one. He was the promoter of Barcelona's candidacy to host the 1924 Olympic Games and promoted the construction of the La Foixarda stadium, inaugurated in 1921. In 1929 he resigned from his job as sports editor of the newspaper La Vanguardia to dedicate himself to the organization of the 1929 Barcelona International Exposition. In 1919 he will also be appointed general secretary of the Automobile Show and will preside over all the Saló de Barcelona that were held in the now-defunct Pavilion of Fine Arts between 1919 and 1935, being stopped due to the outbreak of the Spanish civil war.

Later life
In 1939, at the end of the civil war, he was appointed councilor of the National Sports Council and member of the Spanish Olympic Committee. All the Spanish sports federations became run by the military, the only exceptions were cycling, run by Narciso Masferrer, and tennis, which was in the hands of José Garriga-Nogués. Throughout his life he received numerous honors and recognitions, and was awarded the title of Knight of the Order of Alfonso XII.

Most likely, his own health problems and the premature death of his first wife and three of his children influenced his obsession with healthy living and the regeneration of the Spanish people. In 1940 he was struck down by tuberculosis and was told by doctors his chances of living were slim. He died in Barcelona on 9 April 1941 at the age of 73.

Legacy
There have been many people who, on several occasions, have asked that a street or sports facility be named after Masferrer. The construction of Palau dels Esports de Barcelona in 1955 caused José Sabater Rosich to write in an article entitled "Moment opportune to repair an oblivion", published on 12 July, in which he advocated giving this street the name of a forgotten leader and sports journalist: Narciso Masferrer. In this way, it would be fulfilled "with a debt that Barcelona owes to those who propelled sports with enthusiasm and success". Sabater's proposal did not succeed.

In 1969 the Organizing Committee of the International Motor Show, an organization that Masferrer helped to found, established the 'Narcís Masferrer' journalistic award in his honour. In his memory, the Trofeo Masferrer was held annually in Catalonia from 1932 until 1994.

References

1867 births
1941 deaths
Spanish footballers
Spanish referees and umpires
Spanish gymnasts
Sportspeople from Madrid
Spanish sports journalists
Sportspeople from Barcelona